Mandi (formerly known as Mandav Nagar, also known as Sahor) is a major city and a municipal corporation in Mandi District in the Indian state of Himachal Pradesh.

In the 2011 Indian census, Mandi city had a population of 26,422. Mandi district is currently the 2nd largest economy in the state next to Kangra. Mandi, in the state is having second highest sex ratio of 1013 females per thousand males.

It serves as the headquarters of Mandi District and Zonal Headquarters of central zone including Districts namely Kullu, Bilaspur, and Hamirpur. As a tourist place, Mandi is often referred to as "Varanasi of Hills" or "Choti Kashi" or "Kashi of Himachal". Also, Mandi is the starting point for a trek of the region, Prashar lake trek. From Mandi, trekkers go to Bagi village, which serves as the base village for Prashar lake.

This one-time capital of the princely state of Mandi is a fast-developing city that still retains much of its original charm and character. The city was established in 1527 by Ajbar Sen, as the seat of the Mandi State, a princely state till 1948. Foundation of the city was laid on the establishment of Himachal Pradesh in early 1948. Today, it is widely known for the International Mandi Shivaratri Fair. First heritage city of Himachal Pradesh. The city also has the remains of old palaces and notable examples of 'colonial' architecture. The city had one of the oldest buildings of Himachal Pradesh.

Origin of name

The name "mandi" (and the former name "Mandav Nagar") has its roots from Great Sage Rishi 'Mandav' who prayed in this area, and the rocks turned black due to the severity of his penance. Alternatively, the name may have been derived from the common word mandi which means "market" in Hindi. It may possibly be connected with the Sanskrit root mandaptika, meaning "an open hall or shed,".

While the city's name has always been pronounced "[mŋɖɪ]" in the local language, the anglicized version "Mandav Nagar" was the official name until it was changed to "Mandi". This change is now the most widely used name for the city. Mandi is renowned for its 81 ancient old stone Shaivite temples and their enormous range of fine carving. Because of this, it is also often called the "Varanasi of the Hills".

History

The present District of Mandi was formed with the merger of two princely states, Mandi State and Suket State, on 15 April 1948, when the State of Himachal Pradesh was established. Until the mid-20th century, Mandi was on the trade route between Yarkant County and Ladakh to Hoshiarpur and the Indian plains, served as commercial hub and trade centre.

Historical events

The princely state of Mandi was founded by Bahu Sen in 1200 AD. But Ajbar Sen was the one who founded the historical city of Mandi in 1526 AD. The Chiefs of Mandi State are said to be the descendants of common ancestors of the Chandervanshi line of Rajputs of Sen dynasty of Bengal who claim to be the descendants of Pandavas of Mahabharata times. The present District of Mandi was formed with the merger of two princely states Mandi State and Suket (Sundernagar) on 15 April 1948, when the State of Himachal Pradesh was established. Ajbar Sen assassinated Mandi, it led to the beginning of the modern period of Mandi history. Old Mandi capital was abandoned, and the site of present capital was acquired. Some historians put the selection of present capital in the year 1527 AD. The idol of Madho Rai, the presiding deity of Mandi and incarnation of Lord Vishnu is said to be made by Goldsmith Bhima, in 1648. Maharaja Ranjit Singh occupied Mandi in 1839 but Ranjit Singh died on 27 June 1839.
It was beginning of the disintegration of Sikh powers in the hills and British power emerged as most powerful. In 1849, Princely states of Mandi, Suket and Chamba were put under the control of Superintendent 'Cis-Satluj States'.

Lala Lajpat Rai visited Mandi during 1906 to organize the revolutionary activities. The revolt occurred in Mandi State against the repressive, corrupt and arrogant administration of Raja Bhawani Sen and his Wazir Jiwa Nand Paddha. This revolt was led by Shobha Ram in 1909. A Prominent revolutionary of Mandi, Hardev Ram joined a revolutionary band of patriots in 1913. He went to Shanghai, America and Japan where he met Lala Hardayal and Dr. Mathura Singh. Another revolutionary of Mandi Bhai Hirda Ram started participating in revolutionary activities in 1914. He joined Ras Behari Bose, Sant Baba Wasakha Singh Dadehar, Mathura Singh, Kartar Singh Sarba, Bhai Parma Nand and Pingle. In 1915, on the request of Sarla Devi, wife of Bhai Hirda Ram, the Viceroy converted his death sentence into life imprisonment. In the same year, Nagchala Dacoity in Mandi state took place. In Mandi's conspiracy case, Mandi revolutionary Sidhu Kharara was sentenced for seven years in 1917. Mandi Legislative Council was constituted in 1933. Swami Purna Nand of Mandi was elected as president of "Himalayan Hill states regional Council" (founded in 1945) & Pt. Padam Dev became its general secretary. The session of "Himalayan Hill states regional Council" was held at Mandi from 8 March 1946 to 10 March 1946. It was also attended by INA activists Dhillon, Sehgal and Shah Nawaz Khan. So finally, Mandi came into existence on 15 April 1948. Suraj Sen ruled over Mandi at time of Damdama Mahal of Mandi.

Before independence

The Chiefs of Mandi State are said to be the descendants of common ancestors of the Chandervanshi line of rajputs of Sen dynasty of Bengal who claim to be the descendants of Pandavas of Mahabharata times. According to the earlier accounts, Bahu Sen established an independent territory and was recognized as a Rana or local Chief. The Raja Ajber Sen, the nineteenth descendant from Bahu Sen, was considered as an able and benevolent ruler. He founded the present Mandi city around the 'Bhootnath Temple' in 
the early 16th century (1500 AD-1534 AD) and shifted his capital to this place from Purani Mandi. The temple of Trilokinath was also constructed during his reign. He was succeeded by Chhattar Sen who built a fort in Kalar by name Lakargarh. The successive rulers of Mandi were Shyam Sen, Gaur Sen, Sidh Sen, Shamsher Sen, Surma Sen, Ishwari Sen, Jalam Sen, Balbir Sen and Vijay Sen. Many public utility, services and facilities like schools, hospitals and post offices, etc., were started by Raja Vijay Sen during his time. He also built large number of palaces and houses. A mule road from Baijnath in District Kangra to Sultanpur in adjoining District of Kullu, via Mandi and the Victoria suspension Bridge on river Beas were constructed during his time in the year 1877. Raja Vijay Sen was issue less and left no direct heir. 
So in 1897, Bhawani Sen was recognized as his successor. During his period the city was considerably damaged in the earthquake of 1905. He was succeeded by Joginder Sen in April 1914 who was, however, vested with full powers of ruling chief in February 1925. During the period of his minority, Mandi remained under the management of a British officer, and a number of departments were overhauled and reorganised. Mandi being one of the oldest city is enjoying urban status since 1901. The Mandi palace popularly known as "Raj Mahal" as it looked in the past. The area where the "Sunken Garden" exists today was once a pond.
mandi is also known as MINI PARIS, due to wide market of clothes and fashionable people.

Predecessors and short history

The predecessor state of Siokot was founded in 1527. Formerly part of the Kingdom of Suket in the Punjab Hills, the dynasty traditionally goes back to 765 AD. In about 1100, Vijaya Sen had two sons, Sahu Sen who ruled over Suket and Bahu Sen who ruled over Kullu. Bahu Sen's descendants emigrated to Kullu until the tenth descendant, Kabakha Sen was killed by the Raja of Kullu and his son had to flee to Siokot, not very far from the present city of Mandi which was founded during Ajbar Sen's rule. Since 1986, HH Raja Ashokpal has been the ruler.

After independence
Mandi District was formed by amalgamation of the erstwhile princely states of Mandi and Suket on the formation of Himachal Pradesh on 15 April 1948. Since then, it is serving as the district headquarters of the Mandi District. Mandi district comprises 7 Tehsils namely Joginder Nagar, Sarkaghat, Sundar Nagar, Sadar Mandi, Chachyot, Thunag, Karsog and 9 Sub-Tehsils, i.e., Ladbharol, Padher, Sandhole, Dharmpur, Makreri, Baldwara, Nihri, Kotli, Aut, Bali Chowki.

For the purpose of development activities, the District has been divided into 10 Blocks. The District has a total population of 9,00,987 persons as per 2001 Census and area of 3,950 km2. and covers 7.10% area of the State. The District has six cities including Pandoh as census city. These are namely Mandi, Sunder Nagar, Joginder Nagar, Rewalsar, Sarkaghat and Pandoh. Recently Mandi has become Zonal Headquarters of Central Zone, which covers the Districts of Bilaspur, Hamirpur, Kullu and Mandi itself and has gained much importance from administrative point of view.

Municipal Council
Nagar Parishad Mandi was constituted during 1950. It has 13 wards consisting of 10 Revenue hadbasts. In 2020, it has now become a Municipal Corporation with 15 wards presently having population of 41375 with 14626 households.

Geography

Mandi is built on the banks of the Beas River, at the confluence of the Suketi Khad stream. Sikandar Dhar, Ghugar Dhar and Dhar Kot are some of the prominent hills and mountains found near the city. Mandi is located in 31°72'N latitude and 76°92'E longitude. It lies on the Midlands of the Himalayan range.
There is great variation in the climatic conditions of Himachal due to extreme variation in elevation. The climate varies from hot and sub-humid tropical in the southern tracts to cold, alpine and glacial in the northern and eastern mountain ranges with more elevation.

Geology
Mandi is a bowl-shaped table land on the banks of river Beas, surrounded by the high hill ranges of Gandharv Hills, Motipur Dhar, Rehra Dhar and Tarna Hill. Two small rivulets, Suketi Khad and Skodhi Khad join River Beas. Besides, the table land on the banks of river/streams, terrain is steep and hilly. Geologically, the city is located in seismic Zone No. IV near a fault line and is prone to earthquakes. As National Highway-20 Pathankot-Mandi, National Highway-21 Chandigarh-Mandi-Manali, National Highway-70 Hoshiarpur-Sarkaghat
-Mandi and State Highway-32 Hoshiarpur-Mandi passes through city, it is well connected with Jogindernagar, Palampur, Pathankot, Kullu, Sundernagar, Bilaspur, Chandigarh, Rewalsar, Sarkaghat and Una. Though Mandi is an old and fast developing city yet it still retains its original charm and character.

Climate
Mandi features a subtropical highland climate under the Köppen climate classification. The climate of Mandi is composite having hot summers and cold winters. Mandi generally experiences rainfalls during end of summer season. Mandi city falls in the lower most climatic zone of the Himalayas. These regions enjoys a Wet-sub temperate climate of the foothills (450–900 m) as against the Dry-cold alpine climate with snow fall at higher altitudes (2400 m – 4800 m).

Economy
Mandi is one of the fastest developing towns of Himachal Pradesh, located 
on cross junction of National Highway-20, 21 and 70. It acts as a gateway to Kullu, Lahaul, Leh 
Ladakh, area of Jammu & Kashmir. Being District headquarters, the entire District depends upon the city for trade & commerce, services and civil administration. 
The economy of the region is predominately agrarian as around 79% of 
the total population is dependent on agriculture and activities allied to it, for earning their 
livelihood.

Balh Valley is known for producing quality wheat, paddy, and vegetable crop where the water drainage system and sprinkle system of irrigation have been adopted. The crops of corn 
maize, wheat, rice and vegetables are grown in other parts of the district, which cater to the 
demand of sizeable population. A milk processing plant run by H.P. State Co-Operation-Milk- 
Federation at Chakkar is 8 kilometres from Mandi.

The people of Mandi follow an agrarian economy and cultivate rice, pulses, millets, tea, sesame seed, groundnut, sunflower oil and herbal products. Himachal Pradesh Town and Planning Department works for Mandi Planning area (MPA). More than 9,000 farmers are directly involved in cocoon cultivation for producing Silk in lower hills of Mandi District. Mandi District is also facing tough competition from China, which is marketing raw silk at much lower rates in the market.

Many Hectares of land in Mandi is also under Apple production. Apples are generally planted during December every year. The area under fruit in Mandi is about 15 per cent of the total area under fruits in Himachal Pradesh. Mandi raw silk has acquired wide fame but the salt mines at Drang and Guma are the special features of the economy. With abundant deposit of salt and limestone, possibilities are being investigated for the existence of magnesite, coal and china-clay. Mandi also has fish markets where brown trout is one of the most demanded fish species. In Mandi, a farmer gets around Rs. 200 a kg for Brown Trout.

Government and politics

Established on 15 April 1948, the Mandi municipal council is the oldest elected body nominated by the government of Himachal Pradesh. Municipal Council of Mandi was constituted during 1950. It has 13 wards consisting of 10 Revenue Hadbasts. As of the 2017 general election, the two major political parties are the Bharatiya Janata Party (BJP) (in power) and the Indian National Congress (INC) (in opposition). The administrative head of the council is the Municipal commissioner who is appointed by the state government.

The city contributes one seat to the lower house of parliament (Lok Sabha). Law and order in the city is collectively maintained by the Police Department, Vigilance Department, Enforcement directorate, Forensics, Fire department, department of prisons, and Home Guard department. The Superintendent of Police of Mandi, Mrs Shalini Agnihotri, heads the police department. The Deputy Commissioner of Mandi, Mr. Arindam Chaudhary, is the head of District. There is one District court in the City including other courts in other towns of the district.

Transport

Local transport in Mandi is generally by auto-rickshaw, bus or private vehicles. Tourist taxis are also an option. The taxi station is located right in front of Seri Stage. Auto-rickshaws are the main means of transport in Mandi and are available almost 24 hours. 

The nearest airport to Mandi is the Bhuntar Airport, about 75 km from Mandi city.

Munish Resorts, Visco Resorts and Regent Palms Hotel are hotels and resorts in Mandi. Some other hotels are Raj Mahal, Amar Atithi, Ashoka Holiday Inn, Hotel Evening Plaza, Mandav Hotel (HPTDC), Surbhi Hotel, Hotel Yamini. Most people come to Mandi through Delhi or Chandigarh.

From Delhi
The distance between Delhi and Mandi is about 475 km. This distance can be covered in approximately 12 hrs by bus. 
 
The alternative to reach Mandi from Delhi is to travel by train up to Kiratpur Sahib by Delhi-Una Himachal express (4553). From Kiratpur, there is a bus. All the buses going from Delhi and Chandigarh to Mandi have to pass through Kiratpur.

Also, you can take NH 1 to Ambala and NH 22 to Chandigarh before taking NH 21 to Mandi.

From Chandigarh
From Chandigarh there are buses to Mandi and Manali. The buses from Delhi pass through Chandigarh and some buses start from Chandigarh itself. The distance between Chandigarh and Mandi is 200 km. This distance can be covered in approximately 6 hrs by bus. By taxi, it may take around 5 hrs.

By Air
The nearest airport to Mandi is the Kullu Airport at Bhuntar, about 75 km from Mandi city. This is a small domestic airport; only small aircraft fly to Kullu. Flights to Kullu are restricted only from Delhi, and Shimla. From Delhi, flights to Kullu take about 90 minutes by Indian Airlines or Kingfisher Airlines.

By Rail
There is currently no railway, but one is proposed. There is a proposal to extend the Kangra Valley Railway to Mandi, and connect it to a new Bhanupli–Leh line. The nearest railway station currently is the Jogindernagar Railway Station almost 50 km from the city; this is the current terminus of the Kangra Valley Railway.

Demographics
 India census, City had a population of 26,858. Males constitute 53% of the population and females 47%. Mandi has an average literacy rate of 83.5%, higher than the national average of 65.38% & almost equal to state's literacy rate(83.57%): male literacy is 92%, and female literacy is 75%. In Mandi, 11% of the population is under 6 years of age. Mandi had a very high sex ratio – 1013 girls for every 1000 boys in 2011. Mandi has a mixed population of Hindus, Muslims, Sikhs, Buddhists and Christians with more than 90% population being Hindu. According to census 2011, the city has a population of 26,422.

Culture

Mandi is the cultural capital of Himachal Pradesh. The people of Mandi are informally called Mandyalis. Mandeali language is generally used at local level for communication. Sepu Wadi is the official and main cuisine of Mandi. Dham (Lunch) is generally organised in local marriages, functions and parties. Himachal Darshan Photo Gallery is situated at about 4 km from Mandi near Sauli Khad on the Chandigarh-Manali National highway. This art gallery contains a collection of photographs of exotic locations of the entire state and reflects the social & cultural heritage of the people of Himachal Pradesh. District Library is located in Emerson House (District Court). Clothing in Mandi was Kurta-Pyjama for Boys and Sari-Suits for girls but with the Western Culture arriving to India, Mandi's youth have started wearing Western styles. However, there are still large numbers of people who wear the traditional clothing of Himachal Pradesh. Banthra is the main folk dance performed in theatrical shows in Mandi and is the official folk dance of the District.

The Mandi Shivaratri Fair is an international fair held in Mandi for seven days in the month of February/March every year. The celebration of Shivratri of Mandi is said to have started in the year 1526 to commemorate the foundation of present-day Mandi. Before this, the capital of Mandi was on the right bank of the river Beas, which is now known as Old Mandi (Purani Mandi). Mandi hosts a half marathon every year.
 
Once when the tenth guru of the Sikhs was on a visit to Mandi, the king of Mandi invited him to stay at the royal palace. The guru accepted the invitation to stay in Mandi but not with the king. He put up outside the town in a secluded place, which had once been the hermitage of a rishi (Indian sage). The guru was touched by the king's devotion and prophesied that Mandi would ever remain safe and if any enemy tries to harm it, bolts from heaven would crush the invader. He considered Mandi the safest place on the planet.
V.G.C. mandi hp Youth festival group 4 (one act play, skit, mime and mimicary)

Education

The city has anganwadis, primary schools as well as high schools. Some of the schools in the city include DAV Centenary Public School, Kendriya Vidyalaya, Mandi Public School, Indus Global School, The Phoenix School of Integrated Learning, Vijay Government Senior Secondary School, Government Senior Secondary School (Girls), Sarswati Vidya Mandir nagwain., Sai Public School, St. Xavier Residential School, DAV Sr. Secondary School, Anglo Sanskrit Model School.
The medical institutes in Mandi are Himachal Dental College.  Shri Lal Bahadur Shastri Government Medical College. Jawaharlal Nehru Government Engineering College, T. R. Abhilashi Memorial Institute of Engineering and Technology, and Vallabh Bhai Government College are also located in the city. The Indian Institute of Technology Mandi, is an autonomous and top university of the state for Graduation in BTech/MTech offering many courses.

Media
Mandi has numerous newspaper publications distributed here, television and radio stations. The top Hindi language newspapers are Amar Ujala, Punjab Kesari, Dainik Bhaskar, Dainik Jagran, Devbhumi Mirror, Divya Himachal, Himachal Dastak, Jansatta, Dainik Sawera and Uttam Hindu. Magazines include Outlook, Champak. English language newspapers sold in Mandi include the Times of India, The Hindu, Hindustan Times, Indian Express and The Tribune.

Numerous Indian and international television channels can be watched in Mandi through the local cable television provider. The national television broadcaster, Doordarshan, provides many channels like DD Shimla, DD National, DD Sports, DD Sports HD.

The wide range of cable channels available includes news channels such as Aaj Tak, Lokmat IBN, Zee News, Star News, NDTV 24X7, sports channels like Ten Sports, ESPN, Star Sports, Neo Sports, Neo Cricket, National entertainment channels like Colors, Sony, Zee TV and STAR Plus. Other News channels include Devbhumi Mirror News, HP 24*7, Pole Star, S-TV, Wireless Communication System & GMC NETWORK NER CHOWK. Satellite television (DTH) are very rarely used. Prominent DTH entertainment services in Mandi include Dish TV, TATA Sky, Videocon TV, Reliance Big TV. There are two radio stations in Mandi. People generally use CRT, LCD, LED Televisions.

Sports
Mandi is home to Bandy Federation of India which is a member of the IOC recognized Federation of International Bandy. Bandy Federation of India is Headquartered in Mandi. India has a bandy team. Bandy Federation of India takes care of Bandy in India. India is one of 7 countries in Asia and in total 29 to be a member of Federation of International Bandy.

Cricket and football are one of the most popular sports played in the city. Shaheed Krishan Chand Memorial Stadium in Mandi helds List A cricket matches. It is also known as Paddal ground. It has also held All India Ranji Matches. Badminton courts are made in Town Hall as well as in Paddal. Open Swimming pool is also situated near Bhiuli. There are many Snooker Pools and Table Tennis halls in city at different places. Rishi Dhawan is a cricketer from Mandi who plays for Kings XI Punjab in Indian Premier League.

Adventure tourism in Mandi has gained importance in the recent years due to its thick forest cover, picturesque hills and the splashing waters of the river Beas. Mandi offers an ideal location for all kinds of adventure sports. One such place for adventure Tourism in Mandi is Sundernagar, a small place at the edge of the valley. It is located at a height of over one thousand metres and has some of the tallest trees found in the state. The climate is colder and the tree cover makes this an ideal spot for adventure lovers to go on a nature trail. Many species of birds are seen and the walk through the trees is an amazing adventure, since walking through the dense forest and rappelling down the rocky cliff is very challenging.

Janjehli, located about two hours journey from Mandi, offers treks up to 3000 metres. As the entire road is not motorable, the last part of the journey has to be covered on foot through a thick forest. Another trek from Janjheli takes you through these forests to the temple of the Shikari Devi. This temple devoted to the goddess is said to have been built at the time of the Pandavas and is roofless.

The Himalayan Trout House is about five hours from Mandi, at the Tirthan valley. There is good trout fishing option in the river bed here. Here, brown trout is one of the most demanded fish species. In Mandi, a farmer gets around Rs. 200 a kg for catching Brown Trout. The hydroelectric power station at Jogindernagar can be accessed via a trolley up the rocky cliff to a height of about 2500 metres. The trolley then drops down to the other side to Barot, where the reservoir is located.

Places of worship
Temples
Mandi has more than 300 old and new temples. Because of the large number of temples and its location along River Beas, Mandi is also known as 'Chhoti (Small) Kashi'. Most of the temples are dedicated to Lord Shiva and the Goddess Kali. There are many classical temples which the Archaeological Survey of India has declared 'protected monuments' due to their historical significance, the primary ones being: the 'Panchvaktra Temple', situated at the confluence of River Bea and Suketi Khad, 'Ardhnareshwar Temple', which is one of very few temples of its kind in India. 'Triloknath Temple' is located on the right bank of the Beas River.
The Mata Kuan Rani Temple, consisting of a slate-roofed temple over a deep well which is dedicated to the 'Princess of the Well' and celebrates the time when, according to legend, Mandarava, the Princess of Sahor (Mandi), became a consort of Padmasambhava. The king became angry and condemned them both to death in a fire which raged for seven days. After the smoke cleared there was a lake with a lotus in it, 'Rewalsar' or Tso Pema (Tibetan: 'Lotus Lake').

Gurudwara
Mandi has an historical Gurudwara in honour of Guru Gobind Singh, the 10th Sikh Guru, who spent some time in Mandi. The people and the ruler welcomed him with great warmth and supported the Guru in his war against the tyrannical rule of the Mughal Emperor Aurangzeb; it is said that the city has the Guru's blessings. The Gurdwara is also unofficially referred to as Gurudwara Palang Sahab, because the Guru's Bed 'Palang' is still preserved here.

Mosques
There are two mosques in Mandi city: one is in jail road and other is in Ramnagar (Mangwayi). There is also a mosque (Madina Mosque) near IIT Mandi North campus in Salgi village in Khanahr, 16 km from main Mandi City.

Hydroelectric projects and ecological damage 
Commissioning of Pandoh dam in 1977 diverted 9000 cusecs of Beas river reducing the flow through Mandi thereby adversely affecting the flora and fauna. The once mighty and roaring Beas now has a deserted look in the winter. The flow in Beas was further reduced in 1982 when additional waters were diverted from Uhl river in Barot to Shanan Power House. The citizen council of Mandi filed a writ petition that Pandoh dam release an extra 20 percent water to revitalize the river.

Notable residents
 Kangana Ranaut, Bollywood actress* 
 Jai Ram Thakur, current CM (BJP) in Himachal Pradesh and former President of BJP of the state
 Kaul Singh Thakur, current present President of the state Indian National Congress Committee
 Rishi Dhawan, an all-rounder from Himachal Pradesh cricket team

See also
 Shaheed Krishan Chand Memorial Stadium
 TCV Suja
 IIT Mandi

Gallery

References

Further reading
 
 Emerson (1920): Gazetteer of the Mandi State. 1920. Reprint 1996: Indus Publishing Company, Delhi. .
 Singh, Sarina (2009). India (Lonely Planet Country Guide) (Paperback). 13th Updated edition. .
 Stott, David and Annie Dare (2009). India Handbook 2009: Tread Your Own Path. 16th Edition. Footprint Handbooks. .
 Hutchinson, J. & J. PH Vogel (1933). History of the Panjab Hill States, Vol. II. 1st edition: Government Printing, Pujab, Lahore, 1933. Reprint 2000. Department of Language and Culture, Himachal Pradesh. Chapter IX Mandi State"", pp. 373–412.
 Mandi: a project in a mountainous region of India, Published in 1974 by Authors Zeuner, H. Stiegler, pp. 0–70.
 Gazetteer of the Mandi State, The Present Edition of the Mandi State Gazetteer Was Compiled By Mr. Emerson, I.C.S., Late Settlement Officer And Superintendent, A. Emerson, G.C.L Howell, H.L. Wright are the editors and the book is published by Indus Publishing, 1996. ,  0–205.
 Rough guide to India by David Abram, Edition 5, illustrated; published by Rough Guides, 2003. ,  523–525.
 Mandi area planning: principles of planning for unit areas by Institute of Regional Development Planning from University of California Digitized on 20 Feb 2009 0–74.
 Punjab State Gazetteers: pt. A-B. Mandi and Sukut States, Volume 12, Part 1 of Punjab State Gazetteers, Punjab (India) by Superintendent, Government Printing, 1920 from the University of Michigan Digitized on 2 Sep 2008.
 Punjab State Gazetteers: pt. B. Mandi State, Volume 36, Part 2 of Punjab State Gazetteers, Punjab (India) by Superintendent, Government Printing, 1936 from the University of Michigan Digitized on 2 Sep 2008.
 Punjab district gazetteers, Volume 17, Part 2, Punjab District Gazetteers, Punjab (India) by Superintendent, Government Printing, 1936 from the University of Michigan Digitized on 2 Sep 2008.
 Punjab district gazetteers, Volume 9, Gazetteer of India, Punjab District Gazetteers, Punjab (India) by Controller of Print. and Stationery, 1987.
 Pahari paintings and Sikh portraits in the Lahore Museum by Authors F. S. Aijazuddin, Lahore Museum (Pakistan), published by Sotheby Parke Bernet, 1977 from the University of Michigan Digitized on 2 Dec 2009. ,  64–95.
 The rajas of the Punjab: being the history of the principal states in the Punjab and their political relations with the British government by Sir Lepel Henry Griffin, Edition 2 published by Trübner & Co., 1873 from Oxford University, Digitized on 14 Nov 2007 567–579.
 Journal of the Panjab Historical Society, Volume 7, Part 1 by Panjab Historical Society, published by Baptist Mission Press, 1918 from the University of Michigan digitized on 28 Jul 2007 1–15.
 Spilites and spilitic rocks
International Union of Geological Sciences Series A
Issue 4 of Series A
Volume 4 of Grundlehren der Mathematischen Wissenschaften
Volume 471 of Illus. bibliographie- pp.
Volume 4 of Unión Internacional de Ciencias Geológicas / Trondheim, Noruega
by Gerhardt Christian Amstutz, illustrated published by Springer, 1974 from the University of Michigan, digitized on 23 Feb 2010. ,  175–184.
 Journal of scientific and industrial research, Volume 9 by Council of Scientific & Industrial Research (India), 1950 from the University of Michigan digitized on 18 May 2009 119–122.
 Inventory of monuments and sites of national importance, Volume 1, Part 2 by Jagat Pati Joshi, Archaeological Survey of India,1998 from the University of Michigan digitized on 3 Sep 2008 117–120.
 Memoirs of the Geological Survey of India, Volume 38, Pub. by order of the Governor-General of India, 1981 from the University of Michigan digitized on 19 Oct 2006 44–53.
 Monthly commentary on Indian economic conditions, Volume 9 by Indian Institute of Public Opinion., 1967 from the University of Michigan digitized on 8 Apr 2011 7–13.
 Antiquities of Indian Tibet, Volume 1
Volume 38; Volume 50 of Archæological survey of India
New imperial series
Archaeological survey of India. [Reports] new imperial series, Archaeological Survey of India
Antiquities of Indian Tibet, August Hermann Francke
Volume 38 of Reports: New imperial series, Archaeological Survey of India
published by Superintendent government printing, India, 1914 122–123.
 District Handbook, Himachal Pradesh: Mandi
Volume 2 of District Handbook, Himachal Pradesh, India. Superintendent of Census Operations, Himachal Pradesh
by India. Superintendent of Census Operations, Himachal Pradesh from the University of Michigan digitized on 9 Jun 2011.
 Mandi State, statistical tables by The Mufid-i-'am Press, 1913 0–43.
 Mandi state by The "Civil and Military Gazette" Press, 1908 0–88.
 Himalayan geology, Volume 11 by Wadia Institute of Himalayan Geology., 1983 from the University of Michigan digitized on 14 Apr 2010 93–100.
 Himalayan art
SAMP early 20th-century Indian books project by Joseph Charles French published by Oxford university press, 1931 from Indiana University digitized on 22 Jul 2009 18–23.
 Mandi and Suket States 1912
Punjab District Gazetteers
Volume 12 of Statistical tables published in 1913

External links
 Official site of the Municipal Council of Mandi 
 

Mandi, Himachal Pradesh
Cities and towns in Mandi district
Populated places established in 1527